Mohlat is a 2021 Pakistani family drama soap that premiered on 17 May 2021 on Geo Entertainment. It is a presentation of production house 7th Sky Entertainment owned by Abdullah Kadwani and Asad Qureshi. It stars Bushra Ansari, Asma Abbas, Sami Khan, Kinza Hashmi, and Komal Aziz Khan in lead roles. Supporting cast includes Usama Khan, Tanveer Jamal, Sabeena Farooq, Javeria Abbasi, Daniyal Afzal, Saife Hassan, Nida Mumtaz, and Sharif Baloch.

Written by Samira Fazal and directed by Saima Waseem, the drama serial aired daily at 9:00pm. Episodes would be uploaded to YouTube by 10:00PM PST.

Cast

Main 
 Komal Aziz Khan as Navera (Dawar's 2nd wife)
 Kinza Hashmi as Maham (Dawar's 1st wife)
 Sami Khan as Dawar (Maham's ex-husband, Navera's husband)
 Usama Khan as Essa (Rida's husband)

Supporting
 Bushra Ansari as Talat (Dawar's mother)
 Asma Abbas as Zahida (Maham, Rida, and Navera's mother; antagonist turned protagonist)
 Tanveer Jamal as Tahir (Maham, Rida, Navera, and Ehaab's father; antagonist turned protagonist)
 Danial Afzal Khan as Salman (Maham's ex-boyfriend)
 Saife Hassan as Fareed (Salman's father)
 Sharif Baloch as Saleem
 Nazia as Nasreen
 Sabeena Farooq as Rida (Navera's sister; Essa's wife)
 Javeria Abbasi as Sadaf (Tahir's 2nd wife)
 Aadi Khan as Ehaab (Tahir's son)

Reception
The serial had highest ratings on its time slot through out it's run  (all the 65 episodes lead their respective time slots). It is one of the highest rated drama serial of 2021. Audience criticized the same for depiction of Aziz's character as a weak girl for her crying scenes in the serial.

Lux Style Awards

References

External links 
 Official website

2021 Pakistani television series debuts
2021 Pakistani television series endings
Geo TV original programming
Pakistani drama television series
Urdu-language television shows